Al-A'amiriya (Arabic العامرية) is a neighborhood in the Mansour district of western Baghdad, Iraq, on the way to Anbar Province. The name is also written Amariya, Amariyah, Ameria, Ameriya, Amerya, Amiriya and Amiriyah. 

It used to be an upper-class neighbourhood until sectarian war in 2006. Under ISIS rule, many rurals was displaced from Anbar to Al-A'amiriya, which resulted in even more demographic change.

See also
 Amiriyah shelter bombing (1991)

References
 NY Times article on Al-A'amiriya, 6 September 2007

External links
Wikimapia

Aamiriya